This article shows the rosters of all participating teams at the women's rugby sevens tournament at the 2015 Pan American Games in Toronto. Rosters can have a maximum of 12 athletes.

The Argentine women's rugby sevens team:

 Maria Botelli
 Yamila Otero
 Luciana Travesi
 Mayra Genghinil
 Josefina Padellaro
 Gladys Alcaraz
 Valeria Montero
 Rita Cazorla
 Patricia Fusco
 Sofia Gonzalez
 Magali Fazzi
 Sabrina Marcos

Brazil announced their squad on July 1, 2015.

 Juliana Esteves dos Santos
 Bruna Lotufo
 Beatriz Futuro Muhlbauer
 Edna Santini
 Paula Ishibashi
 Isadora Cerullo
 Claudia Lopes Teles
 Haline Leme Scatrut
 Angelica Pereira Gevaerd
 Maira Bravo Behrendt
 Raquel Kochhann
 Mariana Barbosa Ramalho

Canada announced their squad on June 9, 2015.

 Britt Benn
 Hannah Darling
 Magali Harvey
 Sara Kaljuvee
 Jen Kish
 Ghislaine Landry
 Kayla Moleschi
 Karen Paquin
 Nadia Popov
 Kelly Russell
 Ashley Steacy
 Natasha Watcham-Roy

The Colombian squad.

 Isabel Romero
 Guadalupe López
 Solangie Delgado
 Estefanía Ramírez
 Laura González
 Maria Monroy
 Laura Ortiz
 Alejandra Betancur
 Ana  Ramírez
 Nicole Acevedo
 Camila Lopera
 Luz Zapata

The Mexico women's rugby sevens team:

 Michelle Farah
 Maria Carrillo
 Bertha Landeros
 Alejandra Rosales
 Andrea Rodriguez
 Wendy Garcia
 Georgina Zenteno
 Dorian Avelar
 Bertha Fernandez
 Alma Rivera
 Paulina Islas
 Rosa Rivera

The United States women's rugby sevens team:

 Megan Bonny
 Kelly Griffin
 Joanne Fa'avesi
 Leyla Kelter
 Richelle Stephens
 Lauren Doyle
 Kristen Thomas
 Hannah Lopez
 Melissa Fowler
 Irene Gardner
 Kate Zackary
 Kathryn Johnson

References

Women's team rosters